{{Album ratings
| rev1      = AllMusic
| rev1score = 
| rev2      = About.com
| rev2score = 
| rev3      = Chronicles of Chaos
| rev3score = 6/10
| rev4      = Revolver
| rev4score = 
| rev5      = Rock Sound
| rev5score = 
| rev6      = Sputnikmusic
| rev6score = 
| rev7      = Metal Temple | rev7score = 
| noprose   = yes
}}Revelations of the Black Flame'' is the fourth studio album by Norwegian black metal band 1349.

The studio sessions took place during December 2008 in a woodland studio in Bøverbru (a village in the Toten region of Norway). 1349 mixed the album in January 2009. The album was co-mixed by Tom Gabriel Fischer. This marked the first and as yet, only experimental album by the band, as they almost completely abandoned their earlier old school black metal style, instead making use of irregular song structures and more progressive ideas. The album also contains a variety of dark ambient compositions spread throughout. After this release, the band would return to their previous, more straight-forward style.

Track listing
The limited edition version of the album features a bonus disc containing a live performance in Stockholm recorded in 2005.
 "Invocation" - 6:13
 "Serpentine Sibilance" - 4:35
 "Horns" - 3:04
 "Maggot Fetus... Teeth Like Thorns" - 3:46
 "Misanthropy" - 3:33
 "Uncreation" - 6:59
 "Set the Controls for the Heart of the Sun" (Pink Floyd cover) - 6:13
 "Solitude" - 3:38
 "At the Gate..." - 6:52

Works of Fire, Forces of Hell – Live Stockholm 2005
 "Hellfire" - 5:47
 "Chasing Dragons" - 6:33
 "Satanic Propaganda" - 3:14
 "I Am Abomination" - 4:13
 "Manifest" - 5:06
 "Slaves to Slaughter" - 8:55

Personnel
Ravn – production
Ronni Le Tekrø – production
Tom Gabriel Fischer – mixing
Kjartan Hesthagen – engineering

References

2009 albums
1349 (band) albums
Candlelight Records albums